Melanocytic oral lesions are an extremely uncommon condition characterized by pigmented lesions of the mucous membranes.

See also 
 List of cutaneous conditions
 Mucosal squamous cell carcinoma
 Mucous membrane
 Oral florid papillomatosis

References 

Conditions of the mucous membranes
Oral mucosal pathology
Lesion